Nicolas De Kerpel (born 23 April 1993) is a Belgian field hockey player who plays as a utility player for Royal Herakles HC and the Belgian national team. He can play as a defender, midfielder or forward.

International career
De Kerpel represented Belgium at the 2018 Men's Hockey World Cup. He was a part of the Belgian squad which won Belgium its first European title in 2019. On 25 May 2021, he was selected in the squad for the 2021 EuroHockey Championship.

References

External links

1993 births
Living people
Belgian male field hockey players
Male field hockey defenders
Male field hockey midfielders
Male field hockey forwards
People from Wilrijk
Field hockey players at the 2010 Summer Youth Olympics
Field hockey players at the 2020 Summer Olympics
Olympic field hockey players of Belgium
2018 Men's Hockey World Cup players
Men's Belgian Hockey League players
Olympic gold medalists for Belgium
Medalists at the 2020 Summer Olympics
Olympic medalists in field hockey
2023 Men's FIH Hockey World Cup players
20th-century Belgian people
21st-century Belgian people